ANZAC Rifle Range is a closed railway platform on the Holsworthy railway line in New South Wales, Australia. The platform opened in 1920 and closed on 8 April 1974. The platform served the former ANZAC Rifle Range at Holsworthy Barracks.

See also
 ANZAC Rifle Range, the relocated range at Malabar Headland.

References

Disused railway stations in Sydney
Railway stations in Australia opened in 1920
Railway stations closed in 1974
1974 disestablishments in Australia